Why not? is an album by Michel Camilo, released in 1985.

Recording and music
The album was recorded in February 1985. It was released by Electric Bird. 

"Why Not?" has been a favourite among Camilo's listeners, and has been recorded in many different versions, becoming a standard in Latin jazz. A piano and clarinet version was recorded as Why Not! with Cuban reedman Paquito D'Rivera and a big band version was recorded at the Blue Note.

Track listing 
Just Kiddin' (Camilo)
Hello and Goodbye (Camilo)
Thinking of You (Camilo)
Why Not? (Camilo)
Not Yet (Camilo)
Suite Sandrine, Pt. 5 (Camilo)

Personnel 
Michel Camilo – piano 
Anthony Jackson – bass
Dave Weckl – drums
Lew Soloff –trumpet 
Chris Hunter – alto saxophone, tenor saxophone
Guarionex Aquino – percussion
Sammy Figueroa – percussion

References

External links 
 Michel Camilo Discography

1985 albums
Michel Camilo albums